Stuart Croft  (born 7 March 1963) is a British political scientist and the Vice-Chancellor of Warwick University, a position he has held since 2016. He received a Ph.D. from Southampton University and worked at Birmingham University before joining Warwick in 2007 as Professor of International Security. Croft has published widely in the field of international security and counter-terrorism and is a member of the Academy of Social Sciences and a fellow of the Royal Society of Arts.

Group chat incident

On 1 February 2019, Croft published an open letter on the Warwick University website in response to an incident on campus via a group messenger application that resulted in the temporary suspension of 11 individuals. The letter, which does not mention the victims, was criticised in a response on The Boar – a student-run news website that first publicised the incident. Croft later published a follow-up indicating that two of the men whose ban was lifted would not return.

Selected publications 
Culture, Crisis and America's War on Terror, Cambridge University Press, Cambridge, 2006.
 Securitizing Islam, Cambridge University Press, Cambridge, 2012.

References

1963 births
Living people
Academics of the University of Birmingham
Academics of the University of Warwick
Alumni of the University of Southampton
British political scientists
Counterterrorism theorists
Vice-Chancellors of the University of Warwick